La Rambla can refer to:

 Hispanic term with similar meaning as Esplanade
 Arroyo (creek), a seasonally dry stream bed, rambla in Arabic

Places  
La Rambla (Madrid Metro), a station on Line 7
La Rambla, Barcelona, an iconic and busy street in central Barcelona
 La Rambla (climb), climbing route in Catalonia, Spain
 La Rambla, Córdoba, a municipality in Spain
 La Rambla, Montevideo, an avenue that goes all along the coastline of Montevideo, Uruguay
 La Rambla Building, a building in Carmel-by-the-Sea, California, US